Bostanu or Bustanu or Bestanoo may refer to:
 Bostanu, Bushehr
 Bostanu, Hormozgan
 Bostanu, Bandar Lengeh, Hormozgan Province
 Bostanu, Parsian, Hormozgan Province